The fourth edition of the European Short Course Championships was held in Palau Luis Puig in Valencia, Spain, from December 14 to December 17, 2000, just a couple of months after the Sydney Games.

Medal table

Men's events

50 m freestyle

100 m freestyle

200 m freestyle

400 m freestyle

1500 m freestyle

50 m backstroke

100 m backstroke

200 m backstroke

50 m breaststroke

100 m breaststroke

200 m breaststroke

50 m butterfly

100 m butterfly

200 m butterfly

100 m individual medley

200 m individual medley

400 m individual medley

4×50 m freestyle relay

4×50 m medley relay

Women's events

50 m freestyle

100 m freestyle

200 m freestyle

400 m freestyle

800 m freestyle

50 m backstroke

100 m backstroke

200 m backstroke

50 m breaststroke

100 m breaststroke

200 m breaststroke

50 m butterfly

100 m butterfly

200 m butterfly

100 m individual medley

200 m individual medley

400 m individual medley

4×50 m freestyle relay

4×50 m medley relay

External links
Results book

2000
2000 in swimming
S
Short European 2000
S
Swimming competitions in Spain
December 2000 sports events in Europe
21st century in Valencia